Dick Rogers (1912—1970) was a singer, comedian, songwriter and pianist, who wrote the lyrics for "Harlem Nocturne". He was a member of the Ray Noble orchestra and the Will Osborne band.

Rogers was associated with Will Osborne, a "star crooner" who was on the radio in the 1930s. Osborne's band was on the decline in 1940. Osborne created a "bus and truck vaudeville show", with comedy acts, which did not do well. Dick was hired on as "Stinky" Rogers, doing a singing comedy act. When Osborne moved to Hollywood in 1940, Rogers took over the band. He did well, according to Billboard Magazine, who said he "acquitted himself credibly, as did his orchestra." The magazine called him capable, saying he could sing, compose, play and lead.

Composed music or lyrics
 "Harlem Nocturne" (1939) (with Earle Hagen)
 "Pompton Turnpike" (sung by Frankie Carle) (written with Will Osborne) (1947)
 "Spaghetti Rag" (music by Lyons and Yosco) (1950)
 "Magazines (Are Magic for Lonely People)" (sung by Theresa Brewer) (1958)
 "I Guess I'll Get the Papers and Go Home" (sung by the Mills Brothers (1967)
 "Would'st Could I But Kiss Thy Hand, Oh Babe" (written with Will Osborne) (sung by "Doghouse" Dale Jones))

Footnotes

External links
Billboard magazine, Rogers talked about.
Dick Rogers talked about in the book Serge Chaloff: A Musical Biography and Discography By Vladimir Simosko

20th-century American musicians
American bandleaders
American lyricists
1912 births
1970 deaths